The Choir is a BAFTA award-winning TV series following Gareth Malone as he tackles the task of teaching choral singing to people who have never had the chance, or experience to sing before.

The first series aired on 4 December 2006, the third series, The Choir: Unsung Town, which involved the creation of a choir in South Oxhey, Hertfordshire began on BBC Two on 1 September 2009, whilst the fourth series, The Choir: Military Wives was aired in November 2011. The series began to air on BBC America in the summer of 2010.

Transmissions

The Choir
The original series of The Choir, aired in three episodes in 2006, followed Gareth Malone's attempts to start a choir from scratch in Northolt High School, a comprehensive school in Middlesex that has never previously had a school choir. In the programme he auditions 160 pupils for his 30-strong choir. After only nine months' training, take them to China to compete in the 2006 World Choir Games. This observational documentary series focuses on the emotional journey of the choir members as they overcome their initial reluctance and try to meet Malone's challenge of performing competitively.

The Choir: Revisited
This one-off documentary was filmed as a follow-up to the first series of The Choir and features a return visit to the pupils of Northolt as Malone finds out how the young singers' live have changed in the two years since the first programme.

The Choir: Boys Don't Sing
In the second series, originally aired in 2008, Malone takes his choral mission to the Lancaster School, an all-boys school in Leicester which, like the school in the first series, has no previous singing tradition. The single-sex education setting focuses the programme on issues of gender as Malone tackles the perception that "boys don’t sing".

Malone joins the teaching staff and has to work to gain the trust of fellow teachers. His ambition is to form a 100-strong, all-boys choir performing out on the stage alongside the best school choirs in the country as part of the Schools Prom concert at the Royal Albert Hall. As he tries to drive through his ambitious plans, he also has to spend time in classroom teaching, deal with the daily bureaucracy of being a teacher, and coping with staff politics.

The Choir: Boys Don't Sing – Revisited
This is a one-off documentary follow-up to the second series, in which Gareth Malone returns to the Lancaster School to catch up with the former choir members and find out if he has made a lasting impact on their lives.

The Choir: Unsung Town
The third series of The Choir, broadcast in September 2009, focuses on a town rather than an education setting. Gareth Malone takes his choral challenge to the community of South Oxhey, Watford, a housing estate area where working class culture is strong and there is no tradition of choral singing. Malone's challenge is to break through preconceptions about choirs and motivate local people to sing together, and he succeeds in creating a community choir and staging a choral festival at South Oxhey playing fields.

The legacy of the programme was the creation of the South Oxhey Community Choir and the South Oxhey Youth Choir. During the filming of The Choir, the choirs performed at venues including the Watford Colosseum in December 2008, St Albans Abbey in February 2009, and headlining at Sox Fest '09 in May 2009. In April 2009, the Community Choir made their debut recording at Abbey Road Studios

Gareth Malone continued as choirmaster for two years following the conclusion of the TV recording and now maintains his support as patron. The choir continues to perform regularly with their current musical director, Simon Wookey.

The Choir: Unsung Town – Revisited
This is a one-off documentary follow-up to the third series, in which Gareth Malone returns to South Oxhey to catch up with the choir members both past and present; in order to see if the community is continuing to be united through the use of song.

The Choir does Sport Relief
Aired on 19 March 2010 as part of Sport Relief 2010; Gareth Malone gathered and trained Olympic and Paralympic athletes to form The Sport Relief Choir.

The Choir does Comic Relief
Gareth Malone took part in the BBC's charity fundraising show Comic Relief 2011, which was aired on 18 March 2011. He formed a choir of celebrity chefs (including Ainsley Harriott, Antony Worrall Thompson, Nancy Lam, Rosemary Shrager, Gary Rhodes, Rusty Lee and others) and trained them to sing a choral arrangement of Rick Astley's 1987 song "Never Gonna Give You Up". During rehearsals, Astley appeared in person. The song was performed live on television as part of the fundraiser show.

The Choir: Military Wives
The fourth series, The Choir: Military Wives, began airing on Monday, 7 November 2011 and followed the three-episode format of the previous series. The situation is different from previous series; the setting is on two military bases in Devon (Chivenor Barracks and Royal Citadel, Plymouth), and Malone seeks to enlist voices for an all-women choir - the wives and girlfriends of military personnel deployed to Afghanistan. The programme explores the vulnerability of the women while their partners are away on active service, and Malone's aim is to strengthen their morale and raise their profile in the public perception. The culmination of the programme is a performance by the Military Wives Choir in The Royal British Legion's Remembrance service at the Royal Albert Hall on 12 November 2011.

As a spin-off of the Military Wives series, the Military Wives Choir recorded a CD single of the song Wherever You Are specially composed for the programme by Paul Mealor. The song became the Christmas number-one single.

The DVD of the series was released in June 2012 by Acorn Media UK.

The Choir does Children in Need
Aired on 18 November 2011 as part of Children in Need 2011.

Over 2000 children performed via video link-up from across the UK for the Children in Need 2011 appeal night singing Avril Lavigne's "Keep Holding On".

The Choir: Sing while you work

Series 1
In the 2012 series, Gareth Malone takes his choral mission into places of work, travelling to Lewisham NHS Trust, the Bristol branch of Royal Mail, Manchester Airport and the offices of Severn Trent Water. He sets up a choir of employees in each organisation who then rehearse music with the aim of competing in a singing competition in front of a judging panel consisting of the music director of the John Lewis Partnership, Manvinder Rattan; soul singer Ruby Turner; and choral conductor Ralph Allwood. The winning group is to be judged the best workplace choir. Manchester airport choir were eliminated at the semi final stage. Of the three remaining groups, Severn Trent Water choir won the final.

Series 2
For the second series of Sing While You Work, staff choirs from five organisations are created.

Gareth's All-Star Choir
Gareth forms an All-Star choir, bringing together a group of celebrities from television, sport and theatre with the aim to record and release the official 2014 Children in Need single Wake Me Up (Originally by Avicii). The choir consists of 12 celebrities; Mel Giedroyc, Alison Steadman, Alice Levine, Jo Brand, Linda Robson, Maggie Alphonsi, Craig Revel Horwood, John Craven, Larry Lamb, Fabrice Muamba, Nitin Ganatra and Radzi Chinyanganya.

Ratings

DVD releases

Awards and nominations
The Choir was awarded a BAFTA at the British Academy Television Awards 2007 for Best Feature.
The Choir: Boys Don't Sing won several awards in 2009, including a BAFTA at the British Academy Television Awards 2009 for Best Feature of 2008, the 2009 Broadcast Award of Best Popular Factual Programme, the Royal Television Society 2009 for best Constructed Factual Series, and Best Programme Series in the 2009 VLV Awards
The Choir: Unsung Town was the winner of the Best Factual Programme of 2009 category at the 2010 Broadcasting Press Guild Awards, and was nominated for a BAFTA as best Television Feature of 2009 for the British Academy Television Awards 2010.

United States version
The USA Network planned to air It Takes a Choir starting in October 2014. Episodes had been taped two years earlier. The premiere date was delayed several times, and late in November 2014, the network announced that it would air all eight episodes on the afternoon and evening of 29 December.

See also
 The Naked Choir

References

External links 
 

BBC Television shows
BAFTA winners (television series)
2006 British television series debuts
2000s British music television series
2010s British music television series
BBC television documentaries
Television shows set in England
Choral music
2000s British reality television series
2010s British reality television series
2000s British documentary television series
2010s British documentary television series
English-language television shows
Warner Bros. Television Studios franchises